Perittopus zhengi is a species of Riffle bug from Thailand.

Veliidae
Insects described in 2013
Insects of Thailand